Victoria Regina is a 1934 play by Laurence Housman about Queen Victoria, staged privately in London in 1935, produced on Broadway in 1935, and given its British public premiere in 1937.

Plot

Background
There was a ban on personations of Victoria in public theatres in Britain, and the play was first given at the Gate Theatre, London in May 1935. The Gate, being a theatre club, was technically private and therefore exempt from the prohibition. In 1936 Edward VIII had the ban revoked, and public performances of the play were possible. The first was in 1937 at the Lyric Theatre, London, where Pamela Stanley repeated her performance in the title role seen at the Gate two years earlier. The play ran at the Lyric for 337 performances.

1937 cast
Lord Conyngham – Allan Aynesworth
Archbishop of Canterbury – Douglas Jefferies
Duchess of Kent – Irma Cioba
Victoria – Pamela Stanley
Prince Albert – Carl Esmond
Prince Ernest – Albert Lieven
Mr Anson – John Garside
Lady Muriel – Pamela Carme
Lady Grace – Frances Clare
Lady in Waiting  – Enid Lindsey
Duchess of Sutherland – Mabel Terry-Lewis
Lady Jane – Penelope Dudley Ward
General Grey – Douglas Jefferies
John Brown – James Woodburn
Earl of Beaconsfield – Ernest Milton
Source: The Times.

Broadway

The play was staged three times on Broadway, New York – between 1935 and 1937, twice at the Broadhurst and in 1938 at the Martin Beck. All three productions featured Helen Hayes as Victoria. A twenty-four year old Vincent Price enjoyed his appearance as Prince Albert in the Broadhurst productions.  Hayes as Victoria was recorded on radio in an episode of The Campbell Playhouse.

See also
 Victoria Regina (Hallmark Hall of Fame) - 1961 television adaptation

References

External links
1952 Best Plays radio adaptation at Internet Archive

Sources
 

British plays adapted into films
1934 plays
Cultural depictions of Queen Victoria
Broadway plays
Plays about British royalty
West End plays
Cultural depictions of Albert, Prince Consort